The World Group was the highest level of Fed Cup competition in 2007. Eight nations competed in a three-round knockout competition. Italy was the defending champion, but they were defeated in the final by the No. 1 team Russia.

Participating Teams

Draw

First round

Italy vs. China

Japan vs. France

Russia vs. Spain

United States vs. Belgium

Semifinals

Italy vs. France

Russia vs. United States

Final

Italy vs. Russia

References

See also
Fed Cup structure

World